Delap or DeLap is a surname, and may refer to:

 John Delap (1725-1812), English clergyman and writer
 Kathleen Delap (1910-2004), Irish feminist and activist
 Maude Delap (1866-1953), Irish marine biologist
 Patrick Delap (1932–1987), Irish politician
 Richard Delap (1942-1987), Canadian science fiction writer
 Robert H. DeLap (1846-1922), American politician
 Rory Delap (born 1976), English footballer
 Tony DeLap (born 1927), American sculptor 
 Truman H. DeLap, American politician